Hoplismenus is a genus of parasitoid wasps belonging to the family Ichneumonidae.

The species of this genus are found in Europe and Northern America.

Species:
 Hoplismenus arizonensis Swift, 1946 
 Hoplismenus axillatorius (Thunberg, 1822)

References

Ichneumonidae
Ichneumonidae genera